Omar Ghizlat (born 8 September 1950) is a Moroccan sprinter. He competed in the 400 metres at the 1968 Summer Olympics and the 1972 Summer Olympics. He also won the 100m at the 1980 Islamic Games.

References

1950 births
Living people
Athletes (track and field) at the 1968 Summer Olympics
Athletes (track and field) at the 1972 Summer Olympics
Moroccan male sprinters
Olympic athletes of Morocco
Place of birth missing (living people)